The Tarraleah Power Station is a hydroelectric power station located in the Central Highlands region of Tasmania, Australia. The power station is part of the Upper Derwent hydro scheme and is operated by Hydro Tasmania.

History
The Upper River Derwent hydroelectric scheme was developed at a time in 1934 when the former Hydro-Electric Commission had only two working power stations. In 1934 the Derwent Valley Power Development power scheme was approved by the Parliament of Tasmania with the Tarraleah Power Station as the first completed power station of that scheme.

Ticklebelly Flat, the nickname for the married quarters at Tarraleah Camp number 2 in the 1930s, is a name for the history of Hydro Tasmania by Heather Fenton, known as Ticklebelly Tales.

Power station

Part of the Derwent scheme that now comprises eleven hydroelectric power stations, the Tarraleah Power Station is located aboveground on the west bank of the Nive River downstream from the village of Tarraleah and a short distance from the Lyell Highway. The station draws its water from a variety of sources. Water from the concrete arched Clark Dam across the River Derwent that forms Lake King William flows from the lake and also from the Butlers Gorge Power Station around  via the Tarraleah Canals.

The station output is fed to the transmission grid via 11 kV metal clad switchgear and two 11 /110 kV 75MVA 3-phase power transformers.

Engineering heritage award 
The Tarraleah hydro-electric development received a Historic Engineering Marker from Engineers Australia as part of its Engineering Heritage Recognition Program.

See also

 List of power stations in Tasmania

References

External links

Energy infrastructure completed in 1938
Central Highlands (Tasmania)
Hydroelectric power stations in Tasmania
Recipients of Engineers Australia engineering heritage markers